San Marino and the United States enjoy friendly diplomatic relations.

During the American Civil War, San Marino proposed a republican alliance with the United States, and the government made American President Abraham Lincoln an honorary citizen. He accepted the offer in a letter dated May 7, 1861, saying that the republic proved that "Although your dominion is small, your State is nevertheless one of the most honored, in all history. It has by its experience demonstrated the truth, so full of encouragement to the friends of Humanity, that Government founded on Republican principles is capable of being so administered as to be secure and enduring."

In 1906, the countries signed an extradition treaty. During World War I, the United States intervened on San Marino's behalf and attempted to free San Marinese prisoners of war held in Austria-Hungary. However, their pleas were denied.

The two countries are on excellent terms, with San Marino consistently supporting U.S. foreign policy positions as well as U.S. candidates to international organizations. In September 2006, President George W. Bush appointed Ambassador to Italy Ronald P. Spogli to serve concurrently as Ambassador to San Marino; Spogli is the first U.S. Ambassador to San Marino in the country's history. For consular purposes, the republic is within the jurisdiction of the Florence consular district. Consulate officials regularly visit San Marino to carry out diplomatic demarches, represent U.S. interests, and administer consular services. , John R. Phillips is the U.S. ambassador to San Marino (and Italy).  In July 2007, Ambassador Paolo Rondelli became San Marino's first ambassador to the U.S.

See also
 Foreign relations of San Marino
 Foreign relations of the United States

References

External links

 History of San Marino – U.S. relations
 United States Virtual Presence Post, San Marino

 
United States
Bilateral relations of the United States